Claudio Terzi (born 19 June 1984) is an Italian former professional footballer who played as a centre-back.

Career
His first match in Serie A came against Modena in 2002.  Bologna won the match 3–0.

Having not played in Bologna's first game of the season at Coppa Italia, he swapped clubs with Daniele Portanova on 19 August 2009, four days before the start of Serie A. Terzi was valued €2.5 million.

In May 2010, he was borrowed by A.C. Milan for end season friendly tour to North America.

On 19 July 2013, Terzi moved to Palermo, with whom he signed a contract for four years.

On 25 August 2021, he returned to Siena, now in Serie C.

Italian football scandal
On 11 August 2012, he was suspended for three years and a half due to 2011 Italian football scandal.

Terzi and colleague Filippo De Col were involved in a WhatsApp match-fixing scandal along with Emanuele Calaiò at the end of the 2017–18 season.

Career statistics

Club

Honours 
Palermo
 Serie B: 2013–14

References

External links
 Bologna F.C. Player Profile
 Profile

1984 births
Living people
Footballers from Milan
Italian footballers
Association football defenders
Serie A players
Serie B players
Serie C players
Bologna F.C. 1909 players
S.S.C. Napoli players
A.C.N. Siena 1904 players
Palermo F.C. players
Spezia Calcio players